Domiporta is a genus of sea snails, marine gastropod mollusks in the family Mitridae.

Species
Species within the genus Domiporta include:

 Domiporta aglais (B. Q. Li & S. P. Zhang, 2005)
 Domiporta carnicolor (Reeve, 1844)
 Domiporta circula (Kiener, 1838)
 Domiporta daidaleosa (B. Q. Li & X. Z. Li, 2005)
 Domiporta filaris (Linnaeus, 1771)
 Domiporta gloriola (Cernohorsky, 1970)
 Domiporta granatina (Lamarck, 1811)
 Domiporta hebes (Reeve, 1845)
 Domiporta hibiscula S.-I Huang & Q.-Y. Chuo, 2019
 Domiporta latistriata (Herrmann & Salisbury, 2012)
 Domiporta lichtlei (Herrmann & Salisbury, 2012)
 Domiporta manoui Huang, 2011
 Domiporta praestantissima (Röding, 1798)
 Domiporta shikamai Habe, 1980
 Domiporta sigillata (Azuma, 1965)
 Domiporta valdacantamessae S. J. Maxwell, Dekkers, Berschauer & Congdon, 2017

Species brought into synonymy
 Domiporta citharoidea: synonym of Roseomitra citharoidea (Dohrn, 1862)
 Domiporta dianneae: synonym of Scabricola dianneae (Salisbury & Guillot de Suduiraut, 2003)
 Domiporta filiaris [sic] : synonym of Domiporta filaris (Linnaeus, 1771)
 Domiporta polycincta: synonym of Imbricaria polycincta (Turner, 2007)
 Domiporta roseovitta S.-I Huang, 2011: synonym of Roseomitra roseovitta (Huang, 2011) (original combination)
 Domiporta rufilirata: synonym of Imbricaria rufilirata (Adams & Reeve, 1850)
 Domiporta strangei: synonym of Roseomitra strangei (Angas, 1867)

References

 Cernohorsky W.O. (1970). Systematics of the families Mitridae and Volutomitridae. Bulletin of the Auckland Institute and Museum. 8: 1-190.
 Vaught, K.C. (1989). A classification of the living Mollusca. American Malacologists: Melbourne, FL (USA). . XII, 195 pp.

External links
 Fedosov A., Puillandre N., Herrmann M., Kantor Yu., Oliverio M., Dgebuadze P., Modica M.V. & Bouchet P. (2018). The collapse of Mitra: molecular systematics and morphology of the Mitridae (Gastropoda: Neogastropoda). Zoological Journal of the Linnean Society. 183(2): 253-337

 
Gastropod genera